Live at Montreux 1981 is a live video album released by Mike Oldfield. The concert was recorded on 5 July 1981 at Montreux Jazz Festival and later released on DVD in 2006 by Eagle Vision and Montreux Sounds, with thanks to Virgin Records.

It was a part of Oldfield's European Adventure Tour 1981.

Track listing 
 Intro
 "QE2 Medley": "Taurus 1" / "Sheba" / "Mirage"
 "Platinum Parts 1-4"
 "Tubular Bells Part 2"
 "Medley": "Conflict" / "Ommadawn"
 "Tubular Bells Part 1"
 "Punkadiddle"

Personnel 
 Mike Oldfield – Guitars, mandolin, bass, vocoder
 Mike Frye – Drums and percussion
 Morris Pert – Drums and percussion
 Rick Fenn – Guitars, bass, percussion
 Tim Cross – Keyboards
 Maggie Reilly – vocals

References 

Mike Oldfield video albums
Albums recorded at the Montreux Jazz Festival
2006 live albums
2006 video albums
Live video albums